Metachroma orientale is a species of leaf beetle. It is found in coastal states in the United States, ranging from Texas to Florida to Massachusetts. Its length is between 3.5 and 4.7 mm.

References

Further reading

 
 
 
 
 
 
 
 
 
 

Eumolpinae
Taxa named by Doris Holmes Blake
Beetles described in 1970
Beetles of the United States